David Petel (6 September 1921 – 6 October 2019) was an Israeli politician who served as a member of the Knesset for Mapai and its successors from 1959 until 1969.

Biography
Born in Basra in Iraq, Petel made aliyah to Mandatory Palestine in 1941, and later became chairman of the Iraqi Immigrants Association.

A member of Mapai, he was elected to Bnei Brak city council, and in 1959 was elected to the Knesset on the Mapai list. He was re-elected in 1961 and 1965, by which time Mapai had formed the Alignment alliance. He lost his seat in the 1969 elections. In 1974 he became a member of the Histadrut's Co-ordinating Committee.

References

External links

1921 births
People from Basra
Israeli people of Iraqi-Jewish descent
Iraqi emigrants to Mandatory Palestine
Israeli trade unionists
Mapai politicians
Israeli Labor Party politicians
Alignment (Israel) politicians
Members of the 4th Knesset (1959–1961)
Members of the 5th Knesset (1961–1965)
Members of the 6th Knesset (1965–1969)
2019 deaths
Burials at Segula Cemetery